Outface was an American punk rock band formed in the Cleveland, Ohio, United States, area in the mid 1980s, by Chris Hall and Charlie Garriga fronted, eventually by future Sepultura singer Derrick Green. The band also featured bassist Frank Cavanagh of Filter and guitarist Charlie Garriga of CIV, who was self-taught.  Mark Konopka was the drummer.  They recorded one demo tape in 1987, and later reunited for a studio album, Friendly Green, released in 1992. Stylistically, their music varies between rock, metal and punk with ska elements, not unlike the early works of Red Hot Chili Peppers. Green was credited as Simon Verde on the Outface release.

References

Hardcore punk groups from Ohio
Musical groups from Cleveland